KNEB (960 kHz) is an AM radio station broadcasting a News Talk Information format targeting the agriculture industry. Like its sister station, KNEB-FM, it is licensed to Scottsbluff, Nebraska, United States and serves the Nebraska Panhandle & Southeast Wyoming area.  The station is currently owned by Nebraska Rural Radio Association and features programming from ABC Radio.

In addition, KNEB's programming is simulcast on translator K262CU (100.3 FM).

KNEB is part of the Rural Radio Network, unique in that the stations are owned and operated by a cooperative of farmers and ranchers, the Nebraska Rural Radio Association.

References

External links

NEB
News and talk radio stations in the United States
Radio stations established in 1948
1948 establishments in Nebraska